Dyschirius bengalensis is a species of ground beetle in the subfamily Scaritinae. It was described by Andrewes in 1929.

References

bengalensis
Beetles described in 1929